The 1916 All-Ireland Junior Hurling Championship was the fifth staging of the All-Ireland Junior Championship, the Gaelic Athletic Association's second tier Gaelic football championship.

The All-Ireland final replay was played on 18 November 1917 at Jones's Road in Dublin, between Dublin and Limerick, in what was their first ever championship meeting. Dublin won the match by 6–04 to 0–03 to claim their second championship title overall and a first title in two years.

Results

All-Ireland Junior Football Championship

All-Ireland final

References

Junior
All-Ireland Junior Football Championship